Antti Arell (18 May 1927 – 9 January 2013) was a Finnish rower. He competed in the men's eight event at the 1952 Summer Olympics.

References

External links
 

1927 births
2013 deaths
Finnish male rowers
Olympic rowers of Finland
Rowers at the 1952 Summer Olympics
People from Lapua
Sportspeople from South Ostrobothnia